Liisa Ehrberg (born 17 December 1988) is an Estonian racing cyclist. She rode at the 2014 UCI Road World Championships.

Major results
Source: 

2007
 4th Time trial, National Road Championships
2008
 National Road Championships
3rd Time trial
3rd Road race
2009
 National Road Championships
1st  Time trial
2nd Road race
2010
 National Road Championships
2nd Time trial
2nd Road race
2012
 National Road Championships
3rd Road race
4th Time trial
2013
 National Road Championships
3rd Road race
4th Time trial
 3rd Cross-country marathon, National Mountain Bike Championships
2014
 2nd Road race, National Road Championships
2015
 National Road Championships
1st  Road race
2nd Time trial
 1st  Cross-country marathon, National Mountain Bike Championships
2016
 National Mountain Bike Championships
1st  Cross-country marathon
3rd Cross-country
 National Road Championships
2nd Time trial
5th Road race
2017
 National Road Championships
3rd Time trial
10th Road race
2018
 National Road Championships
1st  Road race
4th Time trial
2019
 National Road Championships
1st  Road race
6th Time trial
 3rd Cross-country marathon, National Mountain Bike Championships
2021
 3rd Road race, National Road Championships
2022
 3rd Cross-country marathon, National Mountain Bike Championships
 10th Cross-country marathon, European Mountain Bike Championships

References

External links

1988 births
Living people
Estonian female cyclists
Place of birth missing (living people)